Baby Won't You Change Your Mind is the second album by American soul/R&B vocal group, Black Ivory. The album was produced by Patrick Adams and David Jordan, and released in December 1972 on Today Records/Perception Records.

Album information
After the success of Black Ivory's top 20 debut album, Don't Turn Around, earlier in that year, they went back into the studio seven months later to record Baby Won't You Change Your Mind. It was released at the end of 1972. The first single from the album, "Time Is Love", written by Patrick Adams and David Jordan was a top 40 hit peaking at NO. 37 on the Billboard R&B singles chart in February 1973. The B-side, "Got to Be There", featured on their debut album, is a remake of Michael Jackson's 1971 song and written by Elliot Willensky. The second and final single from the album, "Spinning Around", was written by Adams, Jordan and June Anderson. It was released in 1973 and peaked at No. 45 on the Billboard R&B chart.

Album Cover by photographer Reginald Wickham and the liner by Lenny Adams, Terry Adams and Bob Demchuck.

Critical reception 
Andrew Hamilton, reviewing the album for AllMusic, described it as "A more even affair than their first LP", and praised Adams' songs and productions alongside Leroy Burgess's vocals and Stuart Bascombe's and Russell Patterson's "arresting harmonies".

Chart performance
Baby Won't You Change Your Mind stayed on the Billboard Top R&B Albums chart for 13 weeks and peaked at No. 26 on March 3, 1973. The album peaked at No. 188 on the Billboard Top 200 Albums chart during a 7-week run.

Track listing

Personnel
Black Ivory
Leroy Burgess - vocals 
Stuart Bascombe - vocals 
Russell Patterson – vocals

Production
Produced, by Patrick Adams and David Jordan
Arranged by Patrick Peter Adams
Album design by Fred Stark 
Engineer – Eddie Korvin
Engineer (mixing) – David Jordan, Eddie Korvin, Patrick Adams
Pressure provided by Boo Frazier, Terry Philips

Charts

'''Singles

References

1972 albums
Black Ivory albums